Hagenbachia is a genus of plants in the  Agavoideae. It is native to Central America and South America.

Hagenbachia brasiliensis Nees & Mart. - Brazil
Hagenbachia columbiana Cruden - Colombia
Hagenbachia ecuadorensis Cruden - Ecuador
Hagenbachia hassleriana (Baker) Cruden - Paraguay, Bolivia
Hagenbachia matogrossensis (Poelln.) Ravenna - Brazil, Bolivia, Paraguay
Hagenbachia panamensis (Standl.) Cruden - Costa Rica, Panama, Colombia, Ecuador

References

Agavoideae